The 1924 Republican National Convention was held in Cleveland, Ohio, at the Public Auditorium, from June 10 to 12.

Incumbent President Calvin Coolidge was nominated for a full term and went on to win the general election. The convention nominated Illinois Governor Frank Orren Lowden for vice president on the second ballot, but he declined the nomination. The convention then selected Charles G. Dawes. Also considered for the nomination was Senator Charles Curtis of Kansas, a future vice president.

Delegates
For this convention the method of allocating delegates changed in order to reduce the overrepresentation of the South. This effort proved only partly successful as Southern delegates proved to be more overrepresented than they had been in 1916 or 1920, though they were not as overrepresented as they had been in 1912 and earlier.

There were 120 women delegates, 11% of the total. The Republican National Committee approved a rule providing for a national committeeman and a national committeewoman from each state.

Ku Klux Klan presence 
The head of the KKK, Imperial Wizard Hiram Wesley Evans, was in the city for the convention but maintained a low public profile. Time featured Evans in a cover photograph in conjunction with an article about the organization's role in the Republican convention, dubbing it "the Kleveland Konvention." As with the 1924 Democratic National Convention, some delegates supported adding a condemnation of the Ku Klux Klan by name into the party platform, but they lacked enough support to bring their proposed language to a vote.

Presidential nomination

Presidential candidates 

Coolidge faced a challenge from California Senator Hiram Johnson and Wisconsin Senator Robert M. La Follette in the 1924 Republican primaries. Coolidge fended off his progressive challengers with convincing wins in the Republican primaries, and was assured of the 1924 presidential nomination by the time the convention began. After his defeat in the primaries, La Follette ran a third party candidacy that attracted significant support.

Declined to run

Presidential Balloting / 3rd Day of Convention (June 12, 1924)

Vice Presidential nomination

Vice Presidential candidates 

As Calvin Coolidge had ascended to the presidency following the death of Warren G. Harding on 2 August 1923, he served the remainder of Harding's term without a vice president as the 25th Amendment had not yet been passed. With Coolidge having locked up the presidential nomination, most attention was focused on the vice presidential nomination.

Secretary of Commerce Herbert Hoover of California and appellate judge William Kenyon of Iowa were seen as the front-runners for the nomination, as both were popular Western progressives who could provide balance to a ticket led by a conservative from Massachusetts. Coolidge's first choice was reported to be Idaho Senator William E. Borah, also a progressive Westerner, but Borah declined to be considered. Illinois Governor Frank O. Lowden, University of Michigan president Marion Leroy Burton, Ambassador Charles B. Warren of Michigan, Washington Senator Wesley Livsey Jones, college president John Lee Coulter of North Dakota, General James Harbord, and General Charles Dawes also had support as potential running mates. Despite saying that he would not accept the nomination, Lowden was nominated for Vice President on the second ballot over Dawes, Kenyon, and Ohio Representative Theodore E. Burton. However, Lowden declined, an action, that , has never been repeated, and is now considered unthinkable. The convention then held another ballot, with Coolidge favoring Hoover. However, the delegates picked Dawes, partly as a reaction to the perceived dominance of Coolidge in running the convention.

Vice Presidential Balloting / 3rd Day of Convention (June 12, 1924)

Prayers

Each of the three days of the convention opened with a lengthy invocation by a different clergymen—one Methodist, one Jewish, one Catholic. Each was listed among the convention officers as an official chaplain.

On June 10, the opening prayer was given by William F. Anderson, Methodist Episcopal bishop of Boston.  Among other things, he called for "stricter observance of the law and the preservation of the Constitution of the United States", in other words, for more zealous enforcement of Prohibition.

The next day's session was opened by Rev. Dr. Samuel Schulman, rabbi of Temple Beth-El in New York. Schulman spoke with appreciation for "the Republican Party's precious heritage of the championship of human rights"; he called for "every form of prejudice and misunderstanding" to be "driven forever out of our land". Speaking of Calvin Coolidge, he praised "the integrity, the wisdom, the fearlessness of our beloved President".

On June 12, the final day's invocation was given by Roman Catholic Bishop Joseph Schrembs of Cleveland. Schrembs characterized President Calvin Coolidge as "a chieftain whose record of faithful public service, and whose personality, untarnished and untainted by the pollution of political corruption, will fill the heart of America with the new hope of a second spring".

See also
History of the United States Republican Party
List of Republican National Conventions
U.S. presidential nomination convention
Republican Party presidential primaries, 1924
1924 United States presidential election
1924 Democratic National Convention

Notes

References

External links
 Republican Party platform of 1924 at The American Presidency Project

Republican National Conventions
Republican National Convention, 1924
1924 United States presidential election
1924 in Ohio
1924 conferences
June 1924 events